Pedro Paulo Saraiva António (21 November 1973 – 23 February 2000), known as Pedro Paulo, was a Portuguese footballer who played as a central midfielder in the Primeira Divisão and the UEFA Cup for Marítimo. He also appeared in the second tier for União Lamas and Esposende, in the third tier for Vasco da Gama (Sines), Benfica Castelo Branco and Camacha, and in the English Third Division (fourth tier) for Darlington.

He began his football career in the junior teams of União Santarém and then Sporting CP, before making his senior debut with Vasco da Gama in the 1992–93 Segunda Divisão B. He was also on the books of Naval, and spent time with English Division Two (third-tier) club Birmingham City without playing first-team football for them.

Pedro Paulo was born in Luanda, Angola. He died in a car crash near Amorim, Póvoa de Varzim, Portugal, in February 2000 at the age of 26. He was married with a young son.

References

1973 births
2000 deaths
Footballers from Luanda
Portuguese footballers
Angolan footballers
Association football midfielders
Sport Benfica e Castelo Branco players
Birmingham City F.C. players
Darlington F.C. players
Associação Naval 1º de Maio players
C.F. União de Lamas players
C.S. Marítimo players
A.D. Esposende players
Segunda Divisão players
English Football League players
Liga Portugal 2 players
Primeira Liga players
Portuguese expatriate footballers
Expatriate footballers in England
Portuguese expatriate sportspeople in England
Road incident deaths in Portugal